Yeungjin University, formerly Yeungjin College, is a private technical college located in Buk-gu, Daegu, South Korea.   Information technology is the principal academic focus; however, courses of study in other fields such as nursing and international tourism are also provided.

Yeungjin University also operates Yeungjin Cyber College, which since 2002 has offered its own two-year courses of study in fields such as computer science and multimedia, e-management, social welfare, and real estate.  The cyber college employs seven full-time instructors and 41 adjunct faculty, teaching a virtual student body of about 800.

History 

The school first opened its doors as Yeungjin Technical School on March 12, 1977.  It became a college in 1985.

Yeungjin University newest project is the Daegu English Village, located outside of Waegwan.

Sister colleges

Yeungjin maintains sisterhood relationships with a total of 34 institutions around the world.  A significant number of these are in the Philippines, as during the 1990s Yeungjin College was actively involved in developing IT programs at many Philippine universities.  Others are located in the United States, Taiwan, China, Japan, Australia, New Zealand, and Switzerland.  The first sisterhood ties established were with Ertong Technical College of Taiwan in 1981.

See also 
 List of colleges and universities in South Korea
 Education in South Korea
Yeungjin University also sends its freshman students to Philippine universities to learn English so that they will be globally competitive and conversant in terms of communicating with other nationalities.
(Jeffrey A. Lucero, R.N., 2007)

External links 
 Official school website, in English and Korean

References 

Universities and colleges in Daegu